The Piedra del Águila Dam (in Spanish, Embalse Piedra del Águila) is the second of five dams on the Limay River in northwestern Argentine Patagonia (the Comahue region) and  above mean sea level, downstream from the confluence of the Limay and the Collón Curá River. It was inaugurated in 1993.

The dam is used for the generation of hydroelectricity and the regulation of the flow of the river.

References

  Secretaría de Energía, República Argentina. Embalse Piedra del Águila

External links

Dams completed in 1993
Energy infrastructure completed in 1993
Dams in Argentina
Hydroelectric power stations in Argentina
Buildings and structures in Neuquén Province
Buildings and structures in Río Negro Province
Dams on the Limay River